The Faith Island, part of   Partridge Island Group, is a low, flat islet in south-eastern Tasmania, Australia.  The islet lies in the D'Entrecasteaux Channel between Bruny Island and the Tasmania mainland.  It contains two gravestones, concealed in the scrub in the north-east of the island.  Its neighbouring islets are named Charity and Hope and also the Arch Rock.

See also

List of islands of Tasmania

References

Islands of South East Tasmania